Yvan Kibundu (born March 26, 1989 in Melun, France) is a French football player. Currently, he plays for Romorantin.

He played first for Chamois Niortais and scored his first goal for this club in the 2–1 Coupe de la Ligue defeat to Créteil on September 3, 2008.

References

External links

1989 births
Living people
French footballers
Association football midfielders
Chamois Niortais F.C. players
Tours FC players
Luçon FC players
Ligue 2 players
SO Romorantin players
Sportspeople from Melun
Footballers from Seine-et-Marne
21st-century French people